The Belwar are a Hindu sanadhya Brahmin caste found in North India, and mostly in Uttar Pradesh. Sanadhya Brahmins are called Belwars in mainly Sitapur, Lakhimpur, Hardoi, Barabanki, Gonda and Lucknow. The like to be called Bilwar or Bailwar as it is a matter of pride for them.

Origin 

The Belwar are a community of Sanadya Brahmin from Awadh, they originally belonged to the Sanadhya Brahmin caste. According to their origin myth, they descend five brothers, one of whom had a daughter. Because of his poverty, he was unable to marry her off. Finally, he accepted whatever proposal came, and married his daughter to a boy from the other Brahmin community . As a consequence of this action, the community were outcast from the Sanadhya Brahmin caste. For a long period, both communities was  distinct. Presently, the intermarriage between them are started.

Present circumstances 

The Belwar are strictly endogamous, and practice clan exogamy. They are Hindu, and Mahadev is their clan deity. Their customs are similar to other Awadh Brahmin communities. They are generally vegetarian.

The Belwar are mainly a landowning community, but are now being urbanised. Those in rural Awadh live in multi-caste villages, but occupy distinct quarters. Each of their settlements contains an informal caste council, known as a biradari panchayat. The panchayat acts as an instrument of social control, dealing with issues such as divorce and adultery.

References 

Brahmin communities of Uttar Pradesh